William Brighty Rands (24 December 1823, Chelsea, Middlesex — 23 April 1882 at the age of 58, East Dulwich, London) was a British writer and one of the major authors of nursery rhymes of the Victorian era. He studied from age 8 to 13. He was mostly self taught. He joined parliament but left due to poor health. His pen names are Matthew Browne, Henry Holbeach, T.Talker.

Biography
A son of a modest candlemaker's family, he attended school from 8 to 13 years of age, and was mostly self-taught, starting to read early and mastering Latin, Greek, and after starting an office career with an international merchant, also Spanish and French. His appreciation of languages he carried through life, studying Chinese in his latest years. 

In 1857, he started working as a reporter in the House of Commons for Messrs. Gurney & Co. and was praised for being very helpful. He wrote his works for children when the Parliament was not sitting. In 1875, he resigned due to poor health.

He wrote under pseudonyms, among them Matthew Browne, Henry Holbeach, and T. Talker.

He was for some time a regular preacher in a chapel at Brixton, and composed several popular hymns, that as well as his nursery rhymes continued their legacy in several editions throughout the 19th century 

He is also remembered for the 2-volume monography of "Chaucer's England".

His poem Great Wide Beautiful Wonderful World had been appeared in a collection called Lilliput Lectures in 1871.

External links
 W. B. Rands, a memorial site by David Rands
 Poems by William Brighty Rands
 [https://openlibrary.org/books/OL7099764M/Lilliput_lyrics Lilliput Lyrics, 1899on of his verse, at the Open Library
 
 

English children's writers
19th-century English poets
Victorian poets
People from Chelsea, London
1823 births
1882 deaths
English male poets